Greed Mask (Traditional Chinese: 謎情家族) is a TVB modern suspense series released overseas in May 2003 and broadcast on TVB Jade Channel in January 2006.

Synopsis
Ko Fung (Roger Kwok)'s girlfriend, Lok Pui-Pui (Halina Tam) pretended to be possessed in order to scam insurance. Fung thinks that Seto Shan (Christine Ng) may be the reason why Pui-Pui is acting delusional but later discovers the real reason. During a car chase with the police, Pui-Pui's car accidentally falls into sea and explodes. Her corpse was never found.

All was put to rest, Fung and Shan started a relationship, however Ko Fung's father, Ko Cheuk-Man (Lo Hoi Pang) was found dead in his house. Fung searches high and low for evidence and finds a secret chamber in his father's bedroom resembling an old factory. He suspects that the murderer must be someone in his household. His cousin Chow Yi-Tung (Annie Man) confessed to the murder but is later found covering for someone else. Man left in his will that Shan would take over the CEO position of his company. Fung starts to think that his girlfriend may be the true murderer...

Cast

Viewership ratings

Awards and nominations
39th TVB Anniversary Awards
 "Best Drama"

References

External links
TVB.com Greed Mask – Official Website 

TVB dramas
2006 Hong Kong television series debuts
2006 Hong Kong television series endings